Oluf Kavlie-Jørgensen (15 April 1902 – 1984) was a Norwegian chess player, Norwegian Chess Championship winner (1938).

Biography
In the 1930s Oluf Kavlie-Jørgensen was one of the leading Norwegian chess players. He has been the strongest player in the Bergen Chess Club Bergens SK for over 60 years. In 1938, in Grimstad Oluf Kavlie-Jørgensen won the Norwegian Chess Championship.

Oluf Kavlie-Jørgensen played for Norway in the Chess Olympiads:
 In 1930, at third board in the 3rd Chess Olympiad in Hamburg (+3, =4, -8),
 In 1937, at second board in the 7th Chess Olympiad in Stockholm (+1, =5, -9).

Oluf Kavlie-Jørgensen played for Norway in the unofficial Chess Olympiad:
 In 1936, at second board in the 3rd unofficial Chess Olympiad in Munich (+2, =4, -11).

References

External links

Oluf Kavlie-Jørgensen chess games at 365chess.com

1902 births
1984 deaths
Sportspeople from Bergen
Norwegian chess players
Chess Olympiad competitors
20th-century chess players